Turtles All the Way Down is an upcoming American romantic drama film directed by Hannah Marks and starring Isabela Merced. It is written by Isaac Aptaker and Elizabeth Berger, based on the 2017 novel of the same name by John Green.

Turtles All the Way Down will be the fifth film or television adaptation of a novel by Green, after The Fault in Our Stars (2014), Paper Towns (2015), Let It Snow (2019), and Looking for Alaska (2019).

Premise 
When a 17-year-old struggling with obsessive–compulsive disorder reconnects with her childhood crush, she confronts the possibility of finding love and happiness in the face of mental illness.

Cast 
Isabela Merced as Aza Holmes
Cree Cicchino as Daisy Ramirez
Felix Mallard as Davis Pickett
Judy Reyes as Gina Holmes
Maliq Johnson as Mychal Turner
J. Smith-Cameron as Professor Abbott
Poorna Jagannathan as Dr. Singh
Hannah Marks as Holly

Production 
The film was optioned by Fox 2000 Pictures upon the publication of the novel in 2017, with Green and Rosianna Halse Rojas as executive producers. Isaac Aptaker and Elizabeth Berger were announced as screenwriters in May 2018, and Hannah Marks was announced as director in January 2019.

However, production was delayed after Disney acquired Fox 2000 Pictures. The project was picked up by New Line Cinema, with distribution rights passing to HBO Max. The film is produced by Marty Bowen, Wyck Godfrey, and Isaac Klausner of Temple Hill Entertainment, the production company which produced screen adaptations of Green's previous novels The Fault in Our Stars, Paper Towns, and Looking for Alaska.

The film was announced in March 2022, with Merced in the lead role. Reyes, Cicchino, and Mallard were announced as part of the cast the following month. In May 2022 it was announced that J. Smith-Cameron, Poorna Jagannathan, and Maliq Johnson would also appear in the film.

Principal photography began in Cincinnati, Ohio, on April 26, 2022.

References

External links 
 

Upcoming films
American romantic drama films
American teen drama films
American teen romance films
Films about obsessive–compulsive disorder
Films based on American novels
Films based on works by John Green (author)
Films based on young adult literature
Films directed by Hannah Marks
Films produced by Wyck Godfrey
Films shot in Cincinnati
HBO Max films
New Line Cinema films
Temple Hill Entertainment films
Upcoming English-language films